Eutorna plumbeola is a moth in the family Depressariidae. It was described by Alfred Jefferis Turner in 1947. It is found in Western Australia.

References

Moths described in 1947
Eutorna